Lapui (also Romanized as Lapū’ī; formerly known as Kaleh-ye Lāpū’ī and Qal‘eh-i-Lapūi - both meaning "Fort Lapui") is a city in Shiraz, Fars Province, Iran.  At the 2006 census, its population was 4,975, in 1,333 families.

References

Populated places in Zarqan County
Cities in Fars Province